Folkestone Warren is a  biological and geological Site of Special Scientific Interest (SSSI) which runs along the coast between Folkestone and Dover in Kent. It is a Nature Conservation Review site and it contains three Geological Conservation Review sites and part of a fourth.

These chalk cliffs have several nationally rare plants and they provide a location for cliff nesting and wintering birds. The SSSI also contains two internationally important reference sites for study of the Cretaceous period.

References

Sites of Special Scientific Interest in Kent
Geological Conservation Review sites
Nature Conservation Review sites
Local Nature Reserves in Kent